Constantine W. Curris is an American academic administrator. Curris also served as president of the American Association of State Colleges and Universities an organization of more than 400 colleges and universities.

Education and honors
Constantine William Curris was born in Lexington, Kentucky, on November 13, 1940 and graduated from the University of Kentucky in 1962 with a B.A. in political science. He obtained an M.A. in political science and public administration from the University of Illinois in 1965 and an Ed.D. in higher education from the University of Kentucky in 1967. He received the Alumni Achievement Award from the College of Arts and Science at the University of Illinois. He is a member of the University of Kentucky Arts & Sciences Hall of Fame, the University of Kentucky College of Education Hall of Fame, and he was inducted into the University of Kentucky Hall of Distinguished Alumni on May 19, 2000.

Career
Curris began his work in higher education in 1965 as vice president and dean of the faculty at Midway College in Kentucky. In 1968 he became director of academic programs for the West Virginia Board of Education. From 1969 through 1971 he was dean of student personnel programs at Marshall University in West Virginia, and for the following two years was the vice president and dean of the faculty at the West Virginia Institute of Technology.

In 1973, the 32-year-old Curris was selected as the president of Murray State University, a position he held until 1983. After Curris's contract was not continued at Murray State in 1983, he was hired as president of University of Northern Iowa. That same year, the Murray State University Board of Regents named the school's new student center after Curris.

Curris was president and professor of public policy at the University of Northern Iowa from 1983 to 1995. During his tenure, Curris began his active involvement with the American Association of State Colleges and Universities. One of the buildings constructed at UNI during Curris's tenure was subsequently named the Curris Business Building by the Iowa State Board of Regents. From 1995 to 1999, he served as president and professor of public policy of Clemson University.

Curris was named president of AASCU in 1999 and served until 2008. He has also been an occasional contributor to The Chronicle of Higher Education, including articles about the public purposes of public colleges, in support of a unit-record system of collecting student data, and about getting college students to the polls.

Boards and commissions
Other professional experiences for Curris include appointments to the 1998 Commission on the Future of the South, the Kellogg Commission on the Future of State and Land-Grant Universities, the Education Commission of the States, the Iowa Board of Economic Development, the South Carolina Research Authority, The Sigma Chi Foundation, and the chairmanships of American Humanics and the Iowa Task Force on Teacher Education and Certification.

Retirement
Since his retirement from AASCU in 2008 Curris has been a consultant in academic searches.
In 2009 he was appointed to the Murray State University Board of Regents and now serves as chairman.

Curris is married to Jo Hern Curris, a tax attorney. They live in Lexington, Kentucky and are the parents of two adult children: Robert Alexander and Elena Diane.

References

1940 births
Living people
Presidents of Murray State University
Presidents of Clemson University
University of Kentucky alumni
University of Illinois alumni
Marshall University faculty
Murray State University faculty
University of Northern Iowa faculty